Bill MacDonald or Macdonald may refer to:

 Bill Macdonald, American sportscaster
 Bill MacDonald (actor), featured in Paradise Falls, Mercy, The Corruptor, Ruby and the Well, etc.
 Bill Macdonald (baseball) (1929–1991), American baseball player
 Bill MacDonald (footballer) (1906–1973), Australian footballer
 Bill MacDonald (Nova Scotia politician), member of the Nova Scotia House of Assembly, Canada
 Bill MacDonald (Ontario politician), Ontario Liberal Party politician, Ontario, Canada
 Bill MacDonald (wrestler) (c. 1920/21–1964), Scottish wrestling champion

See also
 Bill McDonald (disambiguation)
 William MacDonald (disambiguation)